John Gerard Dunlap (August 18, 1925 – October 17, 2010) was a Canadian football player for the Toronto Argonauts of the Interprovincial Rugby Football Union from 1949 to 1950, when he played 22 regular season and 3 playoff games. He played pro football for 11 seasons, and was selected as an All-Star in 1953.

Dunlap blocked a kick that led to the only touchdown in the 38th Grey Cup game, popularly known as the "Mud Bowl".

Dunlap later settled in his hometown, Ottawa, Ontario, and practiced law with his firm Dunlap Dunlap & McInenly. He died on October 17, 2010, in hospital in Ottawa, Ontario. His brother Frank Dunlap was both a Canadian Football League and National Hockey League player.

References

External links
Obituary

1925 births
2010 deaths
Canadian football people from Ottawa
Players of Canadian football from Ontario
Ottawa Rough Riders players
Toronto Argonauts players
Hamilton Tiger-Cats players
Ontario Rugby Football Union players
Ottawa Rough Riders general managers